Your Cheatin' Heart is an album by Freddy Fender that was released in 1976.

Track listing
"Let the Good Times Roll"
"High School Dance"
"You Don't Have To Go"
"Lovers' Quarrel"
"Three Wishes"
"Your Cheatin' Heart"
"Crazy Kat"
"I Got A Woman"
"Whip It on Me"

References

Freddy Fender albums
1976 albums